Stenocatantops is a genus of grasshoppers in the family Acrididae and subfamily Catantopinae. The recorded distribution of species includes: India, China, Indo-China and Malesia through to Australia.

Species

The Orthoptera Species File lists:
Stenocatantops angustifrons (Walker, 1870)
Stenocatantops brevipennis Zhong & Zheng, 2004
Stenocatantops cornelii Willemse, 1968
Stenocatantops exinsula (Willemse, 1934)
Stenocatantops immaculatus Willemse, 1956
Stenocatantops isolatus Willemse, 1968
Stenocatantops keyi Willemse, 1968
Stenocatantops mistshenkoi Willemse, 1968
Stenocatantops nigrovittatus Yin & Yin, 2005
Stenocatantops pasighatinensis Swaminathan, Nagar & Swaminathan, 2018
Stenocatantops philippinensis Willemse, 1968
Stenocatantops splendens (Thunberg, 1815) - type species (as Gryllus splendens Thunberg
Stenocatantops transversa Willemse, 1953
Stenocatantops unicolor Yin & Yin, 2005
Stenocatantops vitripennis (Sjöstedt, 1920)

References

External links
 
 

Acrididae genera
Orthoptera of Asia